Éloi Johanneau (2 October 1770 – 24 July 1851) was a French philologist.

External links
 

1770 births
1851 deaths
19th-century French writers
French philologists
French male writers
19th-century French male writers